Sophie Huber (born 26 November 1985 in Forbach, France) is an Olympic swimmer from France. She swam for France at the 2008 Olympics.

She also swam for France at:
World Championships: 2005, 2007, 2009
European Championships: 2006
Mediterranean Games: 2005, 2009
World University Games: 2005

References

External links
 

1985 births
Living people
People from Forbach
Swimmers at the 2008 Summer Olympics
Olympic swimmers of France
French female freestyle swimmers
World Aquatics Championships medalists in swimming
European Aquatics Championships medalists in swimming
Mediterranean Games gold medalists for France
Swimmers at the 2005 Mediterranean Games
Universiade medalists in swimming
Sportspeople from Moselle (department)
Mediterranean Games medalists in swimming
Universiade bronze medalists for France
Medalists at the 2005 Summer Universiade
21st-century French women